This is a partial list of molecules that contain 24 carbon atoms.

See also
 Carbon number 
 List of compounds with carbon number 23
 List of compounds with carbon numbers 25–29

References

C24